Harry Hill's Fruit Corner was a radio show broadcast on BBC Radio 4 in the United Kingdom. It ran for four series between 1993 and 1997. The series starred Harry Hill, Al Murray, Burt Kwouk and Martin Hyder, and was the predecessor for Hill's breakthrough television series, Harry Hill.

Background
Hill achieved his big breakthrough in August 1992 when he won the Perrier Award for Best Newcomer at the Edinburgh Festival Fringe. The show was commissioned shortly after he received the award. Fruit Corner ran for four series on BBC Radio 4. The first of these, in 1993, contained four episodes, but after the show's success, it returned for three further six episode runs in 1994, 1995 and 1997.

The show acted as a springboard for Hill's television career, and his Channel 4 show, Harry Hill, was similar in style and structure to Fruit Corner. A compilation of the best material from Series 1 to 3 was released on audio CD and cassette on 2 October 1995.

Synopsis
Hill hosted the show as himself, and each week was joined by a number of characters, including his big brother Alan Hill (Al Murray), his three-year-old adopted son, Alan Hill Jr. (Matt Bradstock), his parents, Jan and Tony Hill, and his grandmother, Nana Hill. Later series of the show often saw the family joined by Burt Kwouk.

The show also enjoyed a variety of other celebrity guests across its run, including, most notably, Ronnie Corbett and Rolf Harris.

The show used surreal humour as the basis for many of its jokes. Its presentation was very conversational, with each item tending to involve one or more members of the family.  Later  other recurring characters such as scientist Finsbury Park (Steve Bowditch) were included. Each programme was interspersed with surreal jokes from Harry, common ground for anyone familiar with his stand-up routines.

Episodes
As well as the regular actors featured on the show, Phill Jupitus and Soo Drouet appeared solely in the first series; Phil Nice and Brenda Gilhooly appeared in both the first and second; Joanna Brooks appeared solely in the second; and Peter Serafinowicz appeared solely in the fourth. Edna Doré starred in at least first and fourth series.

A permanent fixture in both the third and fourth series was Burt Kwouk, who appeared as a guest in series two, and liked it so much that he returned frequently. The third series focused on the main cast, but still included other regular actors and celebrity guests.

Series 1 (1993)
 Episode 1 – Monks And Nuns (11 November 1993) – Guests: Bernard Bresslaw
 Episode 2 – Lords And Ladies (18 November 1993) – Guests: Jon Pertwee
 Episode 3 – Police And Thieves (25 November 1993) – Guests: The Beverley Sisters
 Episode 4 – Doctors And Nurses (2 December 1993) – Guests: Bob Holness

Series 2 (1994)
 Episode 1 – Elves And Pixies (17 November 1994) – Guests: Arthur Mullard
 Episode 2 – Judges And Janitors (24 November 1994) – Guests: Rolf Harris
 Episode 3 – Army And Navy (1 December 1994) – Guests: Anita Dobson
 Episode 4 – Minicab Drivers (8 December 1994) – Guests: Burt Kwouk
 Episode 5 – Dons And Dames (15 December 1994) – Guests: June Whitfield
 Episode 6 – Dog And Bone (22 December 1994) – Guests: Ronnie Corbett

Series 3 (1995)
 Episode 1 – Desmond Tutu Sings Motown (31 August 1995) – Guests: Raymond Baxter
 Episode 2 – Prince Charles Sings Musical Youth (7 September 1995) – Guests: Bill Pertwee
 Episode 3 – Jimmy Savile Sings The Cranberries (14 September 1995) – Guests: Stephen Lewis
 Episode 4 – The Fantasy Island Midget Sings Tina Turner (21 September 1995) – Guests: Melvyn Hayes & Stephen Lewis
 Episode 5 – Mike Read Sings Blur (28 September 1995) – Guests: Richard O'Sullivan
 Episode 6 – Desmond Tutu Sings Disney (4 October 1995) – Guests: Johnny Ball

Series 4 (1997)
 Episode 1 – Monks Chant The Ragga Hits (20 March 1997) – Guests: Todd Carty
 Episode 2 – David Bowie Sings The Instrumentals (27 March 1997) – Guests: Johnny Ball
 Episode 3 – Tom Baker Sings Meat Loaf (3 April 1997) – Guests: Lynne Perrie, Christopher Quinten
 Episode 4 – Chewbacca Sings Spandau Ballet (10 April 1997) – Guests: Richard Briers
 Episode 5 – Mariella Frostrup Sings Dionne Warwick (17 April 1997) – Guests: No featured guest. 
 Episode 6 – Alec Guinness Sings Pulp (24 April 1997) – Guests: Jan Leeming

Transmissions

Series

References

BBC Radio comedy programmes
1993 radio programme debuts
1997 radio programme endings
Harry Hill